James Albert Faulkner, MD (October 7, 1877  April 27, 1944) was a Canadian medical practitioner, public servant and a cabinet Minister in the Ontario government.

Background
Faulkner was born in Stirling, Ontario and was of United Empire Loyalist heritage. Initially graduating from McMaster University in 1900 with a degree in arts, he went to McGill University for further education in medicine and graduated in 1904. He set up his medical practice at Foxboro, Ontario and stayed there until 1918 when he moved to Belleville. He served as the Medical Officer of Health for Thurlow Township for 27 years.

Politics
In 1934 he ran for the Liberal Party of Ontario in Hastings West, a predominantly Conservative riding, and was elected to the Legislative Assembly of Ontario. He served as Minister of Health in Mitchell Hepburn's government until the 1937 general election, where he was unable to be reelected.

During his time as Minister, he was noted for being active in the fight against cancer, mental disabilities and streptococcal infections. In 1935, he became involved in the controversy over the Essiac herbal compound, arranging for Frederick Banting to evaluate its claims relating to cancer therapy, but Rene Caisse (Essiac's promoter) refused to cooperate.

Cabinet positions

Later life

Faulkner was later appointed as chairman of the Old Age Pension and Mothers' Allowance Board. He died in 1944 at the Toronto General Hospital following a brief illness.

Further reading

References

External links 
 

1877 births
1944 deaths
Physicians from Ontario
Members of the Executive Council of Ontario
Ontario Liberal Party MPPs
People from Hastings County
McGill University Faculty of Medicine alumni
McMaster University alumni